(October 30, 1218 – June 18, 1234) was the 85th emperor of Japan, according to the traditional order of succession. His reign spanned only months in 1221, and he was not officially listed amongst the emperors until 1870 because of doubts caused by the length of his reign. The Imperial Household Agency recognizes Kujō no misasagi (九條陵) near Tōfuku-ji in Fushimi-ku, Kyoto as his tomb.

Genealogy

He was the first son of Emperor Juntoku. His mother was Ritsushi (?) (立子), daughter of Kujō Yoshitsune (九条良経).

 Consort: Ukyonodaibu-no-Tsubone (右京大夫局), Priest’s daughter
 First Daughter: Imperial Princess Yoshiko (義子内親王) later Wademon’in (和徳門院, 1234 - 1289)

Events of Chūkyō's life
Chūkyō was enthroned at the age of two following the deposition of his father, the Emperor Juntoku in preparation for the Jōkyū Incident, an unsuccessful attempt by Juntoku's father, the Retired Emperor Go-Toba, to overthrow the Kamakura Bakufu.

 1221 (Jōkyū 3, 20th day of the 4th month): In the 11th year of Juntoku-tennōs reign (順徳天皇十一年), the emperor abdicated; and the succession (‘‘senso’’) was received by his eldest son who was only two years old.  Shortly thereafter, Emperor Chūkyō is said to have acceded to the throne (‘‘sokui’’).

That same year, after the Jōkyū Incident, he was dethroned and replaced by his first cousin once removed Emperor Go-Horikawa, the nephew of Emperor Go-Toba.

Because of his dethronement just 2 months after the Jōkyū Incident, his enthronement was not recognized.  He was known as the Kujō Dethroned Emperor (Kujō Haitei, 九条廃帝), the Half-Emperor (半帝), and the Later Dethroned Emperor (Go-Haitei, 後廃帝, a reference to Emperor Junnin who was often called Haitei, 廃帝).

In 1870, he was recognized as an Emperor and given the posthumous name of Emperor Chūkyō.

Kugyō
Kugyō (公卿) is a collective term for the very few most powerful men attached to the court of the Emperor of Japan in pre-Meiji eras.

In general, this elite group included only three to four men at a time.  These were hereditary courtiers whose experience and background would have brought them to the pinnacle of a life's career.  During Chūkyo's reign, this apex of the  Daijō-kan included: 
 Sesshō, Kujō Michiie, 1193–1252.
 Sadaijin, Kujō Michiie.
 Udaijin
 Nadaijin
 Dainagon

Eras of Chūkyō's reign
The year of Chūkyō's reign is more specifically encompassed within a single era name or nengō.
 Jōkyū (1219–1222)

See also
 Emperor of Japan
 List of Emperors of Japan
 Imperial cult

Notes

References

 Brown, Delmer M. and Ichirō Ishida, eds. (1979). [ Jien, c. 1220], Gukanshō (The Future and the Past, a translation and study of the Gukanshō, an interpretative history of Japan written in 1219). Berkeley: University of California Press. 
 Ponsonby-Fane, Richard Arthur Brabazon. (1959).  The Imperial House of Japan. Kyoto: Ponsonby Memorial Society. OCLC 194887
 Titsingh, Isaac, ed. (1834). [Siyun-sai Rin-siyo/Hayashi Gahō, 1652], Nipon o daï itsi ran; ou, Annales des empereurs du Japon.  Paris: Oriental Translation Fund of Great Britain and Ireland.
 Varley, H. Paul , ed. (1980). [ Kitabatake Chikafusa, 1359], Jinnō Shōtōki  (A Chronicle of Gods and Sovereigns: Jinnō Shōtōki. New York: Columbia University Press. 

Japanese emperors
1218 births
1234 deaths
Child monarchs from Asia
Emperor Chukyo
Monarchs who died as children
Emperor Chukyo
13th-century Japanese monarchs